William Howard Gallagher  (1874–1950) was a Major League Baseball shortstop.

Sources

1874 births
1950 deaths
Philadelphia Phillies players
Major League Baseball shortstops
19th-century baseball players
Baseball players from Massachusetts
Toledo Swamp Angels players
Terre Haute Hottentots players
Wilmington Peaches players
Portsmouth Browns players
Reading Actives players
Syracuse Stars (minor league baseball) players
Newport Colts players
Grand Rapids Furniture Makers players
Springfield Wanderers players
Columbus Senators players